Grigory Danilovich Yastrebenetsky (29 October 1923 – 18 March 2022) was a Russian sculptor. He served on the Eastern Front in World War II. Yastrebenetsky was honored with the People's Artist of the RSFSR (1984). He was also a member of the Russian Academy of Arts.

Yastrebenetsky died in March 2022 in Saint Petersburg, at the age of 98.

References 

1923 births
2022 deaths
20th-century Russian male artists
20th-century Russian sculptors
21st-century Russian male artists
21st-century Russian sculptors
People from Baku
Full Members of the Russian Academy of Arts
Repin Institute of Arts alumni
Russian male sculptors
Recipients of the Order of Honour (Russia)
Recipients of the Order of the Red Star
People's Artists of the RSFSR